The South African national cricket team toured England during the 1904 season, playing 22 matches. Most of them were against regular first-class sides, but there were also matches against an England XI (with five players who had already played Test cricket), against Marylebone Cricket Club (with two Test players) and a South of England side with five Test players. The tourists won ten of their 22 matches, and lost two against Worcestershire and Kent. They did not manage to beat any of the top four sides in the Championship, though; they drew with Lancashire and Yorkshire (twice), lost to Kent and tied with Middlesex. No Test matches were played.

The South African team

 Frank Mitchell (captain)
 Ernest Halliwell
 Maitland Hathorn
 Stanley Horwood
 Johannes Kotze
 Charlie Llewellyn
 Bonnor Middleton
 Reggie Schwarz
 Bill Shalders
 George Shepstone
 Jimmy Sinclair
 Tip Snooke
 Louis Tancred
 Benjamin Wallach
 Gordon White

Frank Mitchell also played first-class cricket for Yorkshire during the season, which helped him score more than 1,000 first-class runs in the season. 839 of those were made for South Africa; Louis Tancred (1217) and Maitland Hathorn (1167) were the two players to make more than 1,000 runs for the South Africans. On the bowling side, pace bowler Johannes Kotze headed the attack, claiming 104 wickets in his 22 matches for the South Africans.

References

External links
 South Africa in England, 1904 at Cricinfo
 South Africa in British Isles 1904 at CricketArchive

1904 in English cricket
1904 in South African cricket
English cricket seasons in the 20th century
International cricket competitions from 1888–89 to 1918
1904